"Ballad of Hollis Brown" is a folk song written by Bob Dylan, released in 1964 on his third album The Times They Are A-Changin'. The song tells the story of a South Dakota farmer who, overwhelmed by the desperation of poverty, kills his wife, children and then himself.

Music and structure 
The Times They Are A-Changin''' version was recorded on August 7, 1963.  The song had been recorded during sessions for Dylan's previous album, The Freewheelin' Bob Dylan, in November 1962, but remained an outtake. On this earlier version, Dylan played the harmonica and just strummed the chords, rather than picking the strings. (The live versions between 1962 and 1964 were also played that way, but without the harmonica.) According to Michael Gray, the guitar work and melodic structuring in "Hollis Brown" are taken from the Appalachians, "where such forms and modes had evolved, in comparative isolation, over a period of almost two hundred years". More specifically, the chords, tune and verse-structure of "Ballad of Hollis Brown" are based on the ballad "Pretty Polly", a song Dylan performed at the Gaslight Club in New York City prior to recording "Ballad of Hollis Brown".

The album version of the song is performed as a solo piece by Dylan with his vocal accompanied by an acoustic guitar in the flatpicking style. The guitar is in 'double-dropped D tuning': Both the first and sixth strings, which normally play two Es separated by two octaves, are tuned down a whole step, down to D. Also, Dylan uses a capo on the first fret. Therefore, while his fingers are positioned as if he were playing in the key of D minor, the song is actually in the key of Eb minor.

Lyrics
Lyrically, this song consists of 11 verses which bring the listener to a bleak and destitute South Dakota farm, where a poor farmer, his wife and five children, already living in abject poverty, are subjected to even more hardships. In despair, the man kills his wife and children and himself with a shotgun. Critic David Horowitz commented:

Live performances
Dylan played "Hollis Brown" live from 1962 to 1964, including on a Westinghouse television special in 1963 and at Brandeis University in May 1963 (released in 2011 on Bob Dylan in Concert – Brandeis University 1963).  He also performed it in 1965, during the "comeback" Bob Dylan and the Band 1974 Tour, and at Live Aid in 1985.  The song was regularly featured during the Never Ending Tour through 2012. Dylan has played it over 200 times total.

Recordings by other artists
Some of the prominent musicians and groups that have covered "Ballad of Hollis Brown" include:
Nina Simone: Let It All Out (1965)
Hugues Aufray: Chante Dylan (1965), Trans Dylan (1995), Au Casino de Paris (1996)
Cornelis Vreeswijk: Kalle Holm (1974, Swedish)
Nazareth: Loud 'N' Proud (1974)
Leon Russell: Stop All That Jazz (1974)
The Stooges: Death Trip (1987), Open Up and Bleed (1995), Wild Love (2001)
The Neville Brothers: Yellow Moon (1989)
Stephen Stills: Stills Alone (1991)
Billy Childish: The Ballad of Hollis Brown (1992)
Old Blind Dogs: Legacy (1995)
Mike Seeger (performed with Bob Dylan): Third Annual Farewell Reunion (1995)
Stone the Crows: The BBC Sessions Volume 1 (1969-1970) (1998)
Entombed: Wreckage (EP, 1997), Black Juju (EP, 1998)
Kevn Kinney: The Flower and the Knife (2000)
Hootie and the Blowfish: A Tribute to Bob Dylan, Volume 3: The Times They Are A-Changin' (2000)
Tony Joe White: Swamp Music: The Complete Monument Recordings (disc 4) (2006)
The Pretty Things: Balboa Island (2007)
Rocco DeLuca: The Village (2009)
Francis Cabrel: Vise Le Ciel (2012)
Rise Against: Chimes of Freedom: Songs of Bob Dylan Honoring 50 Years of Amnesty International (2012)
David Lynch: The Big Dream (2013)
Hans Theessink: Wishing Well (2013)
Paula Cole: Ballads (2017)
Karan Casey: Hieroglyphs That Tell the Tale (2018)

References

Matt Cowe and Arthur Dick. Acoustic Masters for Guitar. Wise Publications, 2004.
Bob Dylan's official website. Retrieved 14 March 2006.
Michael Gray. Song & Dance Man III: The Art of Bob Dylan. Continuum, 2000.
Oliver Trager. Keys to the Rain: The Definitive Bob Dylan Encyclopedia''. Billboard Books, 2004.

1964 songs
Blues rock songs
Bob Dylan songs
Fiction about familicide
Folk rock songs
Murder ballads
Nazareth (band) songs
Nina Simone songs
Song recordings produced by Tom Wilson (record producer)
Songs written by Bob Dylan
South Dakota in fiction
Songs about death
Songs about suicide
Songs about poverty
Songs about domestic violence